Cyana amatura is a moth of the family Erebidae first described by Francis Walker in 1863. It is found on Madagascar.

References
Walker (1862). "Characters of undescribed Lepidoptera in the collection of W. W. Saunders, Esq."  Transactions of the Entomological Society of London. (3) 1: 70–128.

External links
Africanmoths: Picture of Cyana amatura

Cyana
Moths described in 1863
Lepidoptera of Madagascar
Moths of Madagascar
Moths of Africa